The GBU-39/B Small Diameter Bomb (SDB) is a  precision-guided glide bomb that is intended to provide aircraft with the ability to carry a higher number of more accurate bombs. Most US Air Force aircraft will be able to carry (using the BRU-61/A rack) a pack of four SDBs in place of a single  bomb. It first entered service in 2006. 

The GBU-53/B Small Diameter Bomb II (SDB2), adds a tri-mode seeker (radar, infrared homing, and semiactive laser guidance) to the INS and GPS guidance of the original SDB.

Description

The original SDB is equipped with a GPS-aided inertial navigation system to attack fixed/stationary targets such as fuel depots, bunkers, etc. The second variant, Raytheon's GBU-53/B SDB II, will include a thermal seeker and radar with automatic target recognition features for striking mobile targets such as tanks, vehicles, and mobile command posts.

The small size of the bomb allows a single strike aircraft to carry more of the munitions than is possible using currently available bomb units. It has integrated "DiamondBack" type wings which deploy after release, increasing the glide time and therefore the maximum range. Its size and accuracy allow for an effective munition with less collateral damage.

CEP is reduced by updating differential GPS offsets prior to weapon release. These offsets are calculated using an SDB Accuracy Support Infrastructure, consisting of three or more GPS receivers at fixed locations transmitting calculated location to a correlation station at the theatre Air Operations Center. The corrections are then transmitted by Link 16 to SDB-equipped aircraft.

Alternative guidance and warheads
In November 2014, the U.S. Air Force began development of a version of the SDB I intended to track and attack sources of electronic warfare jamming directed to disrupt the munitions' guidance. The home-on-GPS jam (HOG-J) seeker works similar to the AGM-88 HARM to follow the source of a radio-frequency jammer to destroy it.

In January 2016, the Air Force awarded a contract to Scientific Systems Co. Inc. to demonstrate the company's ImageNav technology, a vision-based navigation and precision targeting system that compares a terrain database with the host platform's sensor to make course corrections.  ImageNav technology has demonstrated target geo-location and navigation precision within three meters.

In January 2016, Orbital ATK revealed that the Alternative Warhead (AW), designed for the M270's GMLRS to achieve area effects without leaving behind unexploded ordnance, had been successfully tested on the SDB.

Development
In 2002, while Boeing and Lockheed Martin were competing to develop the Small Diameter Bomb, Darleen A. Druyun – at that time Principal Deputy Assistant Secretary of the Air Force for Acquisition and Management – deleted the requirement for moving target engagement, which favored Boeing.  She was later convicted of violating a conflict of interest statute.

In May 2009, Raytheon announced that it had completed its first test flight of the GBU-53/B Small Diameter Bomb II, which has a data link and a tri-mode seeker built with technology developed for the Precision Attack Missile. In August 2010 the U.S. Air Force awarded a $450 million contract for engineering and development.

Although unit costs were somewhat uncertain as of 2006, the estimated cost for the INS/GPS version was around US$70,000. Boeing and the Italian firm Oto Melara signed a contract covering the license production of 500 GBU-39/B (INS/GPS) and 50 BRU-61/A racks for the Aeronautica Militare, at a cost of nearly US$34 million. US$317m was spent on R&D and spares for SDB II in FY13/14, with US$148.5m requested in these categories for FY15, the total budget split roughly 70:30 between USAF and USN. 

SDB II production began in FY14 with 144 bombs for the USAF at a unit cost of US$250,000. The FY15 budget requested 246 bombs at a cost of US$287,000 each.

Timeline
 October 2001 – Boeing is awarded the SDB contract.
 September 2005 – Small Diameter Bomb certified for operational test, evaluation.
 September 2006 – SDB team deliver the first SDBs to the USAF.
 October 2006 – Initial Operational Capability declared for SDB on the F-15E Strike Eagle.
 October 2006 – First use in combat.
 February 2008 – 1,000th SDB I and first 50 FLM delivered.
 September 2008 – Israel received approval from the US Congress to purchase 1,000 bombs.
 December 2008 – Reportedly used against Hamas facilities in the Gaza Strip, including underground rocket launchers.
 January 2009 – Unnamed Boeing official stated that they have yet to deliver any SDBs to Israel.
 June 2010 – FMS request by the Netherlands for 603 units and support equipment valued at US$44 million.
 August 2010 – U.S. Air Force selects Raytheon's GBU-53/B for Small Diameter Bomb II Program.
 2014 – Work begins on home-on-GPS jam.
 May 2015 – SDB II approved by Pentagon for production and deployment on the F-15E.
 April 2016 – FMS request by Australia for 2,950 units and support equipment valued at US$386 million.

Aircraft 
The GBU-39/B began separation tests on the F-22 Raptor in early September 2007 after more than a year of sometimes difficult work to integrate the weapon in the weapons bay and carry out airborne captive carry tests.

The SDB is currently integrated on the F-15E Strike Eagle, Panavia Tornado, JAS-39 Gripen, F-16 Fighting Falcon, F-22 Raptor and AC-130W. Future integration is planned for the F-35 Lightning II, A-10 Thunderbolt II, B-1 Lancer, B-2 Spirit, B-52 Stratofortress and AC-130J. Other aircraft, including UCAVs, may also receive the necessary upgrades.

The General Atomics Predator C is also planned to carry this weapon.

Variants

GBU-39A/B – SDB Focused Lethality Munition (FLM)
Under a contract awarded in September 2006, Boeing developed a version of the SDB I which replaces the steel casing with a lightweight composite casing and the warhead with a focused-blast explosive such as Dense inert metal explosive (DIME). This should further reduce collateral damage when using the weapon for pin-point strikes in urban areas.

On 28 February 2008, Boeing celebrated the delivery of the first 50 FLM weapons.

In December 2013, Boeing delivered the last of the 500 FLMs under contract.

GBU-39B/B – Laser SDB
In mid-2012, the U.S. Senate recommended zeroing out funding for the SDB II due to fielding delays with the F-35 Lightning II.  With the delay in SDB II fielding, Boeing recommended an upgrade to their SDB as a temporary gap-filler to get desired performance at a fraction of the cost.  Called the Laser Small Diameter Bomb (LSDB), it integrates the laser used on the JDAM to enable the bomb to strike moving targets.  Boeing began testing the LSDB in 2011 and successfully hit targets traveling . 

In June 2013, Boeing was awarded a contract to develop and test the LSDB. The contract is for phase one part two engineering, integration and test, and production support and an LSDB Weapon Simulator.  Boeing says the LSDB can be built at a lower cost than the planned Raytheon SDB II, as it will use the same semi-active laser sensor as the JDAM to hit moving and maritime targets.  However, Boeing admits that it does not have the capability to engage targets in zero-visibility weather, as it lacks the SDB II's millimeter wave radar. The Laser SDB began fielding with the U.S. Special Operations Command in 2014.

GBU-53/B SDB2

The GBU-53/B is designed with sensors to be able to recognize and hit moving targets. In late September 2020, the SDB2 (GBU-53/B) was cleared for operational service by USAF Air Combat Command on the F-15E Strike Eagle, after testing at Eglin Air Force Base. About a year of delay was caused by a clip restraint for the fins, with an early version suffering vibration fatigue. Testing with the F-35 is the next phase of the introduction into service.

Ground Launched Small Diameter Bomb (GLSDB)

See also
 H-4 SOW – Pakistani Precision Guided glide bomb.
 Spice (bomb) – Israeli precision bomb convertible unguided to guided
 KGGB – South Korean precision guided glide bomb

References

External links

GBU-39 Small Diameter Bomb / Small Smart Bomb - Global Security
Small Diameter Bomb SDB Focused Lethality Munition (FLM) - Global Security
GBU-39/40/42/B Small Diameter Bomb I/II

Guided bombs of the United States
Boeing
Military equipment introduced in the 2000s